Ambraziūnai (formerly) is a village in Kėdainiai district municipality, in Kaunas County, in central Lithuania. According to the 2011 census, the village had a population of 15 people. The Ambraziūnai Hillfort is located in the village.

History
At the beginning of the 20th century, Ambraziūnai was an okolica. It was a property of the Deveikiai, Ivaškevičiai, Mostavičiai, Račkauskai families.

Demography

Images

References

Villages in Kaunas County
Kėdainiai District Municipality